Raúl Halket (born 4 April 1951) is a former Argentine cyclist. He competed in the team pursuit event at the 1972 Summer Olympics.

References

External links
 

1951 births
Living people
Argentine male cyclists
Olympic cyclists of Argentina
Cyclists at the 1972 Summer Olympics
Place of birth missing (living people)
Pan American Games medalists in cycling
Pan American Games silver medalists for Argentina
Medalists at the 1971 Pan American Games